County Monaghan was a constituency represented in the Irish House of Commons until 1800.

Members of Parliament
1613 Sir Edward Blaney and Sir Bryan McMahon
1634–1635 Artoge McMahon (died and replaced 1634 by Richard Blayney, 4th Baron Blayney) and Collo McBrien McMahon (replaced 1634 by Nicholas Simpson)
1656 Protectorate Parliament Richard Blayney, 4th Baron Blayney
1660 Richard Blayney, 4th Baron Blayney & Oliver Ancketil
1661–1666 Richard Blayney, 4th Baron Blayney and John Foster

1692–1801

References

Historic constituencies in County Monaghan
Constituencies of the Parliament of Ireland (pre-1801)
1800 disestablishments in Ireland
Constituencies disestablished in 1800